The Men's Overall in the 2021 FIS Alpine Skiing World Cup consisted of 35 events in 5 disciplines: downhill, Super-G, giant slalom, slalom, and parallel. The sixth discipline, Alpine combined, had all three of its events in the 2020–21 season cancelled. The tentative season schedule contained 43 events (plus two team parallel events, including one at the season finals), but the final schedule cut the season back to 38 events (and one team parallel event at the season finals). The continuing danger of the COVID-19 pandemic caused the three Alpine combineds (Bormio, Wengen, Bansko) to be canceled in order to keep the speed skiers and the technical skiers separated during the season; additionally, two of the three parallels (Alta Badia, Chamonix) and the second team parallel (Lech/Zürs) were canceled so that other events could take their place and reduce travel. Ultimately, only three of those final 38 races were canceled -- two downhills and a Super-G -- and two of those were canceled by snowstorms during World Cup finals week, as discussed below.

In the next-to-last event during the season finals, French skier Alexis Pinturault clinched the overall season championship and the crystal globe that goes with it.

In addition to the disruption resulting from the continuing COVID-19 pandemic, the season was interrupted by the 2021 World Ski Championships, which were held from 8–21 February in Cortina d'Ampezzo, Italy.

The last four events of the season were scheduled to take place at the final, Wednesday, 17 March through Sunday, 21 March in Lenzerheide, Switzerland. Only the top 25 in each specific discipline for the season and the winner of the Junior World Championship are eligible to compete in the final, with the exception that athletes who have scored at least 500 points in the overall classification are eligible to participate in any discipline, regardless of standing in that discipline for the season. However, on 17 March, the downhill final had to be cancelled after three days of heavy snowfall. On 18 March, the Super-G final was also cancelled, eliminating events in which runner-up Marco Odermatt of Switzerland had a perceived edge over Pinturault. When Pinturault won the giant slalom held on 20 March, he gained an insurmountable lead over Odermatt.

Standings

See also
 2021 Alpine Skiing World Cup – Men's summary rankings
 2021 Alpine Skiing World Cup – Men's Downhill
 2021 Alpine Skiing World Cup – Men's Super-G
 2021 Alpine Skiing World Cup – Men's Giant Slalom
 2021 Alpine Skiing World Cup – Men's Slalom
 2021 Alpine Skiing World Cup – Men's Parallel
 2021 Alpine Skiing World Cup – Women's Overall
 World Cup scoring system

References

External links
 Alpine Skiing at FIS website

Men's Overall
FIS Alpine Ski World Cup overall titles